Lorne Clarke is a Canadian singer-songwriter and concert promoter who first began performing in the mid-1970s in the Toronto folk scene. Born in Toronto, Ontario and raised in the isolated mining community of Schefferville, Quebec, Clarke has since worked at a number of careers. These include stints as a marine engineer on Great Lakes vessels, a high-rise construction carpenter, a dairy farmer, a Toronto police officer, and a power plant operator at a paper mill. Thus it is perhaps understandable that his songs often reveal his working-class background.

Over the years, he has performed his music across the United States and Canada. His debut studio CD, Lorne Clarke was released in 1999 and in 2007 released his second studio CD titled Moonlight & Cider.

In 2000, he became the artistic director and promoter for The Old Lynn Concerts in Lynn, Pennsylvania. This unique, free, concert series runs to packed houses and presents concerts by contemporary folk artists from all over the world.

Clarke is widely known for his continuing work with American song writer, Tom Flannery – specifically the two theme-based song cycles:  Rwanda Songs in 2004 and Hands in the Dark in 2006. These song cycles tackle the difficult issues of genocide and child sexual abuse crisis by Catholic clergy, respectively. Both are available for free download through the artists' web sites.

In addition, in 2006, Clarke and Flannery composed and performed the soundtrack to the award-winning feature-length documentary film, Facing Sudan, directed and produced by Bruce David Janu of Chicago, Illinois. Clarke's song, "How Do We Sleep at Night?" is the opening theme song to the film. In 2008, he contributed several songs to Crayons and Paper, a follow-up to Facing Sudan.

In December 2015, Lorne Clarke released his third all-original album on CD and via digital download.  The album, titled, From My Window, features 14 songs and was recorded, engineered, and produced by Michael Jerling in Saratoga Springs, NY.

External links

Lorne Clarke's Homepage

Canadian male singer-songwriters
Canadian singer-songwriters
Canadian folk musicians
Canadian film score composers
Male film score composers
Living people
Musicians from Toronto
Year of birth missing (living people)